Without Feathers (1975) is one of Woody Allen's best-known books, spending four months on the New York Times Best Seller List. It is a collection of essays and two one-act plays, Death and God.

Title meaning
The title Without Feathers is a reference to Emily Dickinson's poem "'Hope' Is the Thing with Feathers", reflecting Allen's neurotic sense of hopelessness. The poem is mentioned in one of the stories.

Contents
 Selections from The Allen Notebooks
 Examining Psychic Phenomena
 A Guide to Some of the Lesser Ballets
 The Scrolls
 Lovborg's Women Considered
 The Whore of Mensa 
 Death (A Play)
 The Early Essays
 A Brief Yet Helpful Guide to Civil Disobedience
 Match Wits With Inspector Ford
 The Irish Genius
 God (A Play)
 Fabulous Tales and Mythical Beasts
 But Soft. Real Soft.
 If the Impressionists Had Been Dentists
 No Kaddish for Weinstein
 Fine Times: An Oral Memoir
 Slang Origins

Notes and references

1975 books
Comedy books
Short story collections by Woody Allen
Jewish comedy and humor
English-language books
Random House books